Arambol is a traditional fisherman village, located approximately a 90 minutes drive from Dabolim Airport (GOI) within the Pernem administrative region of North Goa, India. The beach attracts many international tourists, mainly during the winter season between November and March. 

Arambol beach is rumored to be one of the most beautiful beaches in Goa, bordering Keri Beach to the north and Mandrem Beach to the south.

Weather 

 Rainfall: 3117 mm
 Maximum temperature: 34 °C
 Minimum temperature: 23 °C

Arambol's warmest month of the year is usually April with an average high of 34 °C. The sunniest	months are January, February, April, May and December with around 10 hours of sunshine per day. The dry period in Arambol corresponds with its main tourist season, from December to April, which normally doesn't see any rain. The warmest sea temperature is between April and June with an average high of 29 °C.

Utilities and services

Sanitation and drinking water 
The town has an open drainage system. Water is supplied from a service reservoir. The town gets it water as tap water from a treated source. The capacity of the water supply system is 650 kilo-litres.
The nearest fire fighting service is at Pernem (13 km).

Manufacturing 
Arambol (CT) is engaged in the manufacturing of following items (in decreasing order of importance): country liquor, chili products, dry fish

Market and banking 
Every Wednesday, a weekly market takes place at the Arambol Bus Stand area, where local vegetable vendors sell their products such as Green Leafy Vegetables, Potatoes, Spices, Fruits and similar edible products. There are few supermarkets on the Arambol Street that caters to all the basic kitchen needs and supplies.

There is a branch of Bank of India, State Bank of India and HDFC Bank near the Arambol Bus Stand area. There are 3 banking cooperative societies also.

Religion

The majority of the Indian residents are Hindu. Christian and Muslim minorities are also present. The Church of Our Lady of Mount Carmel serves the religious interests of the many Catholics in the area.

Sports

As in many other parts of Goa, both football and cricket are popular sports with the people of this area.

Attractions

A short walk north off the main beach is a smaller beach with a "fresh water lake" close to the sea. The jungle valley, enclosed between low hills, hides a banyan tree. Adjoining the banyan tree there is a stone sculpture created by an American conceptual and land art artist, Jacek Tylicki, titled Give if you can - Take if you have to (also called The Money Stone). It has become a pilgrimage destination.

Another attraction is Arambol Drum Circle & Sunset Beach Market, one of the most unique flea markets in Goa. It starts a few hours before the sunset where travelers from all over the world sell their hand made creations. More than just a market, it is a party on the beach where people bring their drums, hand-pans, Didgeridoo (didgeridoo) and meet here everyday to make music as the sun sets. It is common to see performers at this time with their juggling balls, hula hoops, poi and many other props. With things like handmade clothes, food, jewelry, glass pipes – this market looks like it is right out of a music festival.

Due to the composition of both national and international musicians, Arambol is home to a rich live music scene, dominated by Gypsie-Fusion bands.

Activities

Strong winds during the main season make it a significant location for leisure sports, like paragliding and kite surfing. Every evening during the peak tourist season, there are sunset parties on Arambol beach. A variety of practitioners in Alternative medicine and Wellness (alternative medicine) offer courses in Yoga, meditation, Odissi dance, and musical instruments (like Tabla, Sitar and other traditional Indian as well as Western instruments).

Events
The Tribal Dance Festival and the Indian Juggling Convention take place in Arambol. The Goa Contact Festival and In-Touch Festival both offer Contact Improvisation Dance and Somatics. All are scheduled for late January/early February.

References

External links

Beaches of Goa
Cities and towns in North Goa district
Paragliding in India
Beaches of North Goa district